Cameron Mills is a hamlet in Steuben County, New York, United States. Cameron Mills has a post office with ZIP code 14820, which opened on March 19, 1850.

References

Hamlets in Steuben County, New York
Hamlets in New York (state)